Ramesh Vithaldas 'Buck' Divecha  (18 October 1927 – 19 February 2003) was an Indian Test cricketer.

Divecha was a right-arm bowler who bowled fast-medium or off-breaks, and a useful batsman.

In 1942 while studying in Wilson College he was arrested in connection with the Quit India movement. He was not charged, and he took no active part in politics after that. His father V.J. Divecha was a club cricketer, President of the Bombay Cricket Association and the Vice President of the Board of Control for Cricket in India.

While studying at Worcester College, Oxford, Divecha played four seasons of cricket for Oxford University and earned blues in 1950 and 1951. He appeared for Northamptonshire against the Australians in 1948 and played Minor Counties cricket for Oxfordshire.

Divecha toured England in 1952 and took 50 wickets. He took a hat-trick against Surrey  and a career best 8 for 74 against Glamorgan  in the next match. He played Tests against England in 1951–52 and 1952, and Pakistan in 1952–53 but achieved little.

Divecha's career in Indian domestic cricket was far shorter than that in England. He played one Ranji Trophy match for Bombay in 1951–52, one for Madhya Pradesh in 1954–55 and four for Saurashtra in 1962–63. In these six matches he took 22 wickets at 27.50. After his early retirement from cricket, he became a prominent golf player.

Divecha took an M.A. from Oxford. He was an executive with Burmah Shell and Mahindra & Mahindra.

His death came after a prolonged illness. He suffered from Alzheimer's disease.

References
  Richard Cashman, Patrons, Players and the Crowd (1980), p. 87
  Obituary in Wisden Cricketer's Almanack 2004
 Obituary in Indian Cricket 2004
 Christopher Martin-Jenkins, The Complete Who's Who of Test Cricketers

External links

India Test cricketers
Indian cricketers
Mumbai cricketers
Saurashtra cricketers
Madhya Pradesh cricketers
Northamptonshire cricketers
1927 births
2003 deaths
Burmah-Castrol
BP people
Oxford University cricketers
Oxfordshire cricketers
Minor Counties cricketers
Gentlemen cricketers
Alumni of Worcester College, Oxford
Cricketers from Maharashtra